The Pan-Caribbean Congress (PCC) is a unitary Caribbean-wide political organisation which was formed officially on April 27, 2003 in Barbados.  According to the earliest press releases there were six member-islands at time of formation.  The new party was formed under the auspices and in collaboration with the Clement Payne Movement, of Barbados.

The Insignia: The symbol of the organisation is of a steelpan, containing within it are the outlines and names of the various states & territories of the Caribbean region.

The Motto: "One People, One Caribbean, One Destiny."

During the three-day meeting, a five-member steering committee was selected, and the participants came from:

Antigua and Barbuda
Barbados
Grenada
Saint Vincent and the Grenadines
Trinidad and Tobago

The Five-member steering committee:

Mr. Bobby Clarke - Barbados
Mr. David Comissiong - Barbados
Mr. David Denny - Barbados
Mr. André Liverpool - Saint Vincent
Mr. Courtwright Marshall - Antigua
Mr. George Odlum - St Lucia was appointed as senior advisor to the steering Committee.

The group has the goal of forming a "Union of Caribbean States" through a full Political Union of all members states.  Although only six-members states were at the original grouping the PCC hopes to expand into every single Caribbean territory and state whether independent or not.

Politics of Barbados
Political organisations based in Barbados
Political parties in the Caribbean